Rory Steele is an Australian author and former public servant and diplomat.

Born 1943 in Western Australia.  Oxford University 1962-66 (BA Hons Modern Languages).  Taught Italian in Naples 1964–65. In 1969 he joined the Australian Diplomatic Service and had overseas postings in Ghana, South Korea, Egypt and Switzerland (Geneva). From 1986 to 1988 he was Australian ambassador to Iraq and from 1997 to 2001 was ambassador to Italy.  In 2007 he won the ACT Writing and Publishing Awards fiction category for his book entitled Ghosts in the Helmet Trees.

Bibliography
 Ghosts in the Helmet Trees, Ginninderra Press, Canberra, 2006, 
 Obverse and Parallel Lines, Indigo Press, Canberra, 2004, 
 Academy of the Superfluous, Ginninderra Press, Canberra, 2006, 
 Diaspora Parliaments (co-authored with Bruno Mascitelli and Simone Battiston), Connor Court Publishing, Ballan, Victoria, 2010, 
 The Loveliness of Terror, 2012
 The Heart and the Abyss - The Life of Felice Benuzzi, Connor Court, Queensland, 2016,  
 Il cuore e l'abisso - La vita di Felice Benuzzi, Alpine Studio, Lecco, 2017, 
 Ben O'Dowd - Hero of Kapyong, Hesperian Press, Perth, Western Australia, 2019,

References

Living people
1943 births
People from the Australian Capital Territory
Writers from the Australian Capital Territory
Ambassadors of Australia to Italy
Ambassadors of Australia to Albania
Ambassadors of Australia to San Marino
Ambassadors of Australia to Iraq